The Mackinaw River State Fish and Wildlife Area is a  state park in Tazewell County, Illinois.  It is operated by the Illinois Department of Natural Resources (IDNR). The Area dates to 1970, when a conservation group based in Bloomington, the Parklands Foundation, donated its acreage to the state.

The Mackinaw River SFWA consists of more than two square miles of upslope on the south bank of the Mackinaw River, primarily wooded land with some upland meadows. The Mackinaw River SWFA is primarily managed for the hunting of whitetail deer, although fishing and canoeing are also welcomed.

The Mackinaw River is a free-running river throughout most of its length, and therefore offers potential for the preservation of fish and shellfish species (particularly mussels) historically associated with the tallgrass prairie.  However, most of the river's drainage is heavily utilized for crop farming, with its potential for erosion and consequent siltation.  Sixty-six percent of the river's drainage is cropland.  The Mackinaw River State Fish and Wildlife Area is an island of natural drainage into the vulnerable river, although it takes up less than 1.2% of the river's total watershed.

The nearest town to the Mackinaw River SFWA is Mackinaw, Illinois.

External links
 
 University of Illinois - Mackinaw River

References

 

State parks of Illinois
Protected areas of Tazewell County, Illinois
Protected areas established in 1970
1970 establishments in Illinois